The Wilpita rasbora (Rasbora wilpita) is a species of ray-finned fish in the family Cyprinidae.
It is found only in Wilpita, Sri Lanka where it occurs in heavily shaded shallow, sluggish, streams.

Sources

Rasboras
Freshwater fish of Sri Lanka
Taxa named by Maurice Kottelat
Taxa named by Rohan Pethiyagoda
Fish described in 1991
Taxonomy articles created by Polbot